The Yemen national basketball team  represents Yemen in international basketball competitions. It is managed by the Yemen Basketball Association (YBA). Its best result was 4th place at the 2005 West Asian Basketball Championship.

Competitive record

Summer Olympics
Yet to qualify

World championships
Yet to qualify

FIBA Asia Cup

Asian Games

1951–1978 : Did not qualify
1982 : 12th
1986–2018 : Did not qualify
2022 : To be determined

Islamic Solidarity Games

2005 : 13th
2013–2017 : Did not participate

West Asian Basketball Championship
2005 : 4th
2012 : 6th
2014 : 6th

Current roster
At the 2014 WABA Championship Games: 

 

 

|}

 

| valign="top" |

 

Head coach

Assistant coaches

 

Legend

 

Club – describes lastclub before the tournament

Age – describes ageon 26 May 2014

 

|}

Head coach position
 Ozell Wells – 2009
 Guy Arnaud – 2012

References

External links
Asiabasket.com - Yemen Men National Team
Yemen Basketball Association at facebook.com

Men's national basketball teams
Basketball
1971 establishments in Yemen
Basketball in Yemen
Basketball teams in Yemen
Basketball teams established in 1971